Mingjiao Temple, formerly known as Iron Buddha Temple, is a Buddhist temple located in the Luyang District of Hefei, Anhui, China. Mingjiao Temple was originally built in the early 6th century, but because of war and natural disasters has been rebuilt numerous times since then. The present version was renovated and redecorated in 2015.

History

The original temple dates back to the early 6th century during the Southern and Northern dynasties (420–589). After the fall of Sui dynasty (589–618), the temple was completely destroyed in war.

Tang dynasty
During the reign of Emperor Daizong (763–779) in the Tang dynasty (618–907), local people dug out an iron statue of Buddha in the ruins. Pei Xiu (791–864), the then provincial governor of Luzhou, reported the circumstance to the central government, the emperor issued the decree rebuilding the temple on the original site.

Ming dynasty
The name was changed into "Mingjiao Temple" in the Ming dynasty (1368–1644), which is still in use now.

Qing dynasty
In 1853, in the ruling of Xianfeng Emperor (1851–1861) in the Qing dynasty (1644–1911), Mingjiao Temple was again devastated by war and rebuilt in 1870, during the Tongzhi era (1862–1874). After the perdition of Taiping Heavenly Kingdom (1851–1864), the former general Yuan Hongmo lived in seclusion at the temple and named "Tongyuan". He restored the Mahavira Hall in 1886, under the rule of Guangxu period (1875–1908).

Republic of China
On July 7, 1937, after the Marco Polo Bridge Incident, the Second Sino-Japanese War broke out. In the winter of that same year, part of the halls and rooms in Mingjiao Temple was badly damaged by Japanese fighters. Two years later, Mingjiao Temple was occupied by the Imperial Japanese Army.

People's Republic of China
Mingjiao Temple has been designated as a National Key Buddhist Temple in Han Chinese Area by the State Council of China in 1983. The temple reactivated its religious activities and was opened for worship in the following year.

Mingjiao Temple has been rebuilt several times since 1949, most recently in 2015.

Architecture
The existing main buildings include the Shanmen, Four Heavenly Kings Hall, Mahavira Hall, Hall of Ksitigarbha, Reception Hall, and other rooms.

Mahavira Hall
Under the eaves is a plaque with the Chinese characters "Mahavira Hall" written by the former Venerable Master of the Buddhist Association of China Zhao Puchu. The Mahavira Hall enshrining the statues of Five Tathagatas, which are all comes from Beijing. The statues of Eighteen Arhats stand on both sides of the hall.

References

Buddhist temples in Hefei
Buildings and structures in Hefei
Tourist attractions in Hefei
20th-century establishments in China
20th-century Buddhist temples
Linji school temples